Rilima is a town in southeastern Rwanda. It is the nearest urban center to Bugesera International Airport.

Location
Rilima is located in Bugesera District, Eastern Province, south of Kigali, the national capital and the largest city in the country. The geographical coordinates of Rilima are:02°09'35.0"S, 30°13'31.0"E (Latitude:-2.159722; Longitude:30.225278).

Overview
Rilima is reachable from Kigali, in about one hour by private car. Among the institutions found in or near the town is the Centre Orthopédique Sainte Marie Rilima (Saint Mary's Othopedic Hospital Rilima), a 70-bed orthopedic hospital that specializes in treating pediatric orthopedic problems, including club foot, bow-legs and others.

Another institution found in the town, is the Rilima Prison, which holds over 7,400 inmates, the majority of whom are awaiting trial. The Rilima Health Centre is an outreach healthcare facility that distributes food to nutritionally vulnerable women and children. It instructs mothers on how to prepare the donated food for achieving optimum benefits. Parents are also taught how to grow nutritious vegetables. Family planning services, good hygiene practices and balanced diet selection are taught.

The most recent institution to come to Rilima is Bugesera International Airport, whose construction started in August 2017, and completion of the first phase is expected in 2019.

See also
 Nyamata

References

Bugesera District
Eastern Province, Rwanda
Populated places in Rwanda